George Berkeley (1685–1753) was an Irish philosopher and Anglican bishop.

George Berkeley or Berkley may also refer to:
 George Berkeley, 8th Baron Berkeley (1601–1658), English nobleman
 George Berkeley, 1st Earl of Berkeley (1628–1698), English aristocrat
 George Berkeley (died 1746) (after 1680–1746), British member of parliament
 Sir George Cranfield Berkeley (1753–1818), naval officer and politician
 Sir George Berkeley (British Army officer) (1785–1857), British soldier and Conservative politician
 Grantley Berkeley (George Charles Grantley Fitzhardinge Berkeley, 1800–1881), writer and British member of parliament 
 Sir George Berkley (engineer) (died 1893), British civil engineer
 Sir George Berkeley (colonial administrator) (1819–1905), British colonial administrator
 George Fitz-Hardinge Berkeley (1870–1955), English cricketer
 George Monck Berkeley (1763–1793), English playwright and author